Mummy's Boys is a 1936 American comedy film directed by Fred Guiol and written by Jack Townley, Philip G. Epstein and Charles E. Roberts. The film stars Bert Wheeler, Robert Woolsey, Barbara Pepper, Moroni Olsen, Frank M. Thomas and Willie Best. The film was released on October 2, 1936, by RKO Pictures.

Plot
Phillip Browning (Frank M. Thomas), convinced that the mysterious deaths of ten of his colleagues is the result of a mummy's curse, hopes to avoid the fate of the others by returning King Pharatime's treasures to his tomb. Ditch diggers Stanley Wright (Bert Wheeler) and Aloysius C. Whittaker (Robert Woolsey) answer a newspaper advertisement to join Browning's Egyptian expedition. Whittaker presents himself (unconvincingly) as an Egyptian expert, and Wright—who is immediately attracted to Browning's daughter Mary (Barbara Pepper)—makes a poor impression because he suffers spells of forgetfulness that can be cured only by taking a nap. (This is a running gag throughout the film.) Browning hires them anyway.

On board the ship to Egypt the next day the boys meet Sterling (Moroni Olsen), who is part of the expedition. Catfish (Willie Best), a stowaway, is invited to join the group after he mentions that he is from Cairo—although Whittaker and Wright later discover that he is from Cairo, Illinois. After the group arrives at their hotel, Sterling disappears mysteriously and a threatening note is found.

Soon after they arrive at their encampment, Whittaker, Wright and Mary awake to find Catfish tied up and everyone else gone. They find another threatening note in Browning's tent. They open Mr. Browning's instructions, which direct them to dig to the tomb entrance and place the boxes containing the treasures in the tomb. The three men dig until they have the entrance cleared, and start carrying the boxes into the tomb. The scene cuts to a secret room of the tomb, where Sterling has Browning tied up and gagged. Sterling reveals that he killed the other ten with a syringe containing undetectable poison, and plans to do the same to Browning, Mary, Whittaker and Wright. He leaves, but accidentally drops a diary, which Wright later picks up.

A landslide seals the entrance and traps Whittaker, Wright, Mary and Catfish in the tomb. As they search for a way out, Sterling approaches them, pretending to be a victim of kidnapping and professing to believe in the curse. Wright reveals that he knows the deaths are actually murders—he has read the diary, but has not yet learned the identity of the killer. He does not recall where he hid the diary, and needs to take a nap to remember. Sterling offers to inject him with a "sedative". Wright, fearing the syringe, leads them all on a merry chase, ending when he hits Sterling on the head with a vase. The vase smashes, revealing the diary, which Whittaker picks up. He examines it and realizes that Sterling is the murderer.

The police arrive at the camp, enter the tomb, and bring Sterling to justice. The Egyptian spy who warned Wright over the phone turns out to be an Egyptian secret policeman, Rasheed Bey (Francis McDonald), who was investigating Sterling.

At the fadeout, Wright has something he wants to say to Mary, but can't remember what it is.

Cast 
Bert Wheeler as Stanley Wright
Robert Woolsey as Aloysius C. Whittaker
Barbara Pepper as Mary Browning
Moroni Olsen as Dr. Edward Sterling
Frank M. Thomas as Phillip Browning
Willie Best as Catfish
Francis McDonald as Rasheed Bey
Frank Lackteen as Second Oriental
Charles Coleman as Kendall
Mitchell Lewis as Haroun Pasha
Frederick Burton as Professor Edwards

References

External links 
 

1936 films
American black-and-white films
RKO Pictures films
Films directed by Fred Guiol
1936 comedy films
American comedy films
1930s English-language films
1930s American films